WTSQ-LP (88.1 FM) is a Freeform community radio station in Charleston, West Virginia, that specializes in alternative and indie rock programmed by its disc jockeys. Its broadcasting license is owned by Masque Informed, an independent 501(c)(3) organization. There are weekly programs dedicated to other musical genres, including rockabilly, metal, hip hop, funk, electronica, honky tonk, punk, and world music, as well as weekly talk radio programs. Live, in-studio performances by artists are also regularly scheduled.

Regular, Monday-through-Friday programming includes Democracy Now!, Morning Mix with Mya, and The Afternoon Show with Josh Gaffin.

References

External links
 88.1 WTSQ Online
 

2015 establishments in West Virginia
Radio stations established in 2015
TSQ-LP
TSQ-LP